Radoslav Batak (born 15 August 1977) is a Montenegrin professional football manager and a former player who played as a defender. He is the manager of Serbian club Vojvodina.

Club career
Born in Novi Sad, Batak started out at Metalac Futog in 1989, before joining the youth system of Vojvodina in 1993. He was loaned to ČSK Čelarevo, Mladost Apatin and Vrbas. After moving abroad in 2003, Batak went on to play for Dynamo Moscow, Ankaraspor, Antalyaspor and Tobol.

International career
Batak made his debut for Montenegro in his country's first ever competitive match on 24 March 2007, a friendly against Hungary in Podgorica and made 25 appearances, scoring one goal. His final international was an October 2011 European Championship qualification match away against Switzerland.

International goals

Managerial career
In early 2015, Batak was appointed assistant manager to Alexandre Gama at Thai club Buriram United. He switched to fellow Thai club Sisaket the following year.

In April 2017, Batak was appointed manager of Vojvodina. He parted ways with the club on 30 June following a 2–1 home win over Ružomberok in the first leg of the 2017–18 UEFA Europa League first qualifying round.

After two seasons spent in Thailand, Batak returned to Serbian football on 25 February 2020, as a manager of Serbian SuperLiga club Radnički Niš. He works with another UEFA Pro licensed coach Davor Berber who joined from AFC Champions League club Tai Po.

Batak's first game was against Vojvodina, the club where he started his career, played for six years, and had managed back in 2017.

In November 2020, Batak was appointed coach of Serbian SuperLiga club Novi Pazar, alongside Davor Berber.

Managerial statistics

References

External links
 
 
 

1977 births
Living people
Footballers from Novi Sad
Serbian people of Montenegrin descent
Association football defenders
Serbia and Montenegro footballers
Montenegrin footballers
Montenegro international footballers
FK Vojvodina players
FK ČSK Čelarevo players
FK Mladost Apatin players
FK Vrbas players
RFK Grafičar Beograd players
FC Dynamo Moscow players
Ankaraspor footballers
Antalyaspor footballers
FK Mogren players
FC Tobol players
First League of Serbia and Montenegro players
Russian Premier League players
Süper Lig players
Montenegrin First League players
Kazakhstan Premier League players
Serbia and Montenegro expatriate footballers
Expatriate footballers in Russia
Serbia and Montenegro expatriate sportspeople in Russia
Expatriate footballers in Turkey
Serbia and Montenegro expatriate sportspeople in Turkey
Montenegrin expatriate footballers
Montenegrin expatriate sportspeople in Turkey
Expatriate footballers in Kazakhstan
Montenegrin expatriate sportspeople in Kazakhstan
Montenegrin football managers
FK Vojvodina managers
Radoslav Batak
FK Radnički Niš managers
FK Novi Pazar managers
Serbian SuperLiga managers
Montenegrin expatriate football managers
Expatriate football managers in Serbia
Montenegrin expatriate sportspeople in Serbia
Expatriate football managers in Thailand
Montenegrin expatriate sportspeople in Thailand